Weiskittel-Roehle Burial Vault is a historic burial vault located in Section P, Loudon Park Cemetery, Baltimore, Maryland.  It is a rectangular structure made of cast iron built into the side of a hill, constructed to look like ashlar masonry and painted gray. It was made as the tomb of Anton W. Weiskittel who died in 1884, a Baltimore iron founder.

It was listed on the National Register of Historic Places in 1976.

References

External links
, including photo from 1996, at Maryland Historical Trust

Cemeteries on the National Register of Historic Places in Baltimore
Houses completed in 1884
Buildings and structures in Baltimore
Victorian architecture in Maryland
Cemeteries in Baltimore
Irvington, Baltimore